Cambridge was the name of a number of steamships.

, a Great Eastern Railway passenger ferry
, built as Vogtland and surrendered by Germany as war reparations
, a Design 1023 ship built by the Submarine Boat Company 1919, broken up 1925

Ship names